Dilodendron is a genus of flowering plants belonging to the family Sapindaceae.

Its native range is Central and Southern Tropical America.

Species:

Dilodendron bipinnatum 
Dilodendron costaricense 
Dilodendron elegans

References

Sapindaceae
Sapindaceae genera